The 1979 Dallas Cowboys season was their 20th in the league. The team was unable to improve on their previous output of 12–4, winning eleven games. They qualified for the playoffs, but lost in the Divisional round.

The Cowboys still possessed a great offense, but suffered defensive losses as defensive tackle Jethro Pugh retired, safety Charlie Waters missed the season with injury, Ed "Too Tall" Jones left the team while he embarked on a professional boxing career (Jones would return in 1980), and Thomas "Hollywood" Henderson was cut in November for erratic play and behavior.  The season began 8–2 before a three-game losing streak placed the season in jeopardy (one of the three being a 30–24 loss to Houston in which Oilers coach Bum Phillips declared the Oilers as "Texas's Team").   The team rallied to win their final three to finish at 11–5 and gain the number one seed in the NFC.

Playing in his final season, Roger Staubach proceeded to have the best year of his career completing 267 passes out of 461 attempts for 3,586 yards and 27 touchdowns with only 11 interceptions with a passer rating of 92.3 and a completion percentage of 57.9.

In the season's final regular season game against the Washington Redskins, with the NFC East Title at issue, Staubach rallied the Cowboys from a 34–21 deficit in the last four minutes to win, 35–34.  It turned out to be Staubach's last win.  The Cowboys were upset at home in the divisional playoff by the Los Angeles Rams 19–21 and Staubach retired after the season.

Offseason

NFL Draft

Schedule

Division opponents are in bold text

Season summary

Week 1

Week 2

Week 3

Week 4

Week 5

Week 6

Week 7

Week 8

Week 9

Week 10

Week 11

Week 12

Week 13

Week 14

Week 15

Week 16 vs Redskins

It was December 16, 1979, when the Washington Redskins came to Texas Stadium tied with the Cowboys for first place in the NFC East with 10-5 records. This game would turn out to be one of Roger Staubach's finest moments as well as his last great comeback in his Cowboys career.

The NFC East showdown between these heated rivals did not start out the way the Cowboys had wanted. On the Cowboys first two possessions of the game they fumbled and the Redskins took full advantage of the recoveries

It took only two plays on the Cowboys first possession before rookie Ron Springs fumbled at the Cowboys 34 yard line. The Redskins took over and drove to the Cowboys three yard line. On third and goal Larry Cole sacked Redskins quarterback Joe Theismann and forced the Redskins to kick a field goal by Mark Mosley for an early 3-0 lead.

On the Cowboys second possession they once again fumbled the ball away. This time it was Robert Newhouse who gave the ball to the Redskins on the Cowboys 45 yard line. The Redskins drove to the Cowboys one yard line, but this time Theismann made sure there would be no field goal attempt as he scored himself, giving the Redskins a 10-0 lead.

With the Redskins leading 10-0 going into the second quarter and the Cowboys offense showing no signs of life, the Redskins offense went back to work with an 80-yard, 7 play drive. They finished the drive when Theismann connected with running back Benny Malone who eluded a tackle by D.D. Lewis. Malone raced down the right sideline for a 55-yard touchdown giving the Redskins a commanding 17-0 lead.

The Cowboys offense seemed to wake up on their next possession. They put together a 13 play, 70 yard drive. From the Redskins one yard line it was Ron Springs who would make up for his earlier fumble as he scored the Cowboys first touchdown of the game. The Redskins were now leading 17-7 with a little more than four minutes left in the first half.

With only 1:48 left in the first half the Cowboys got the ball back on their own 15 yard line. Staubach went to work as he connected with Tony Hill three times and Drew Pearson once to get to the Redskins 26 yard line. With only nine seconds remaining Staubach connected with Preston Pearson for the touchdown as Pearson made a diving catch in the end zone. The Cowboys had fought their way back into the game with two second quarter touchdowns. They went into the half down 17-14.

In the third quarter the Cowboys defense shutdown the Redskins offense. The Cowboys offense took advantage and scored the only touchdown of the quarter, which gave them their first lead of the game. After a short Redskins punt the Cowboys took over at their own 48 yard line. They needed only nine plays, which included a Butch Johnson reverse that gained 13 yards. Preston Pearson took a short pass from Staubach and got the Cowboys to the two yard line. Like Ron Springs in the first half, it was now Newhouse's turn to make up for his earlier fumble. He scored from the two yard line, giving the Cowboys a 21-17 lead.

Early in the fourth quarter the Redskins drove to the Cowboys 7 yard line where they would have to settle for a Mark Mosley 24 yard field goal. That made the score 21-20 Cowboys.

Staubach threw his only interception of the game when he went deep over the middle from his own 13 yard line where there was no receiver in sight. Redskins safety Mark Murphy came down with the ball and returned it down to the Cowboys 25 yard line. On the Redskins first play Theismann threw into the end zone for receiver Ricky Thompson. Cowboys safety Cliff Harris bumped Thompson and was called for pass interference. The penalty placed the ball at the Cowboys one yard line where John Riggins scored to give the lead back to the Redskins, 27-21.

With less than seven minutes to play in the game, it was Riggins who seemed to put the game out of reach for the Cowboys.  Riggins broke to the outside at his own 34 yard line as he outran Cowboys linebacker Mike Hegman and then broke a tackle by Cliff Harris. Riggins then raced away from Cowboys cornerback Dennis Thurman down the right sideline and scored from 66 yards for a 34-21 Redskins lead.

With 3:49 left in the game, Randy White recovered a Redskins fumble. Roger Staubach only needed three plays to get the Cowboys closer as he connected with Ron Springs for a 26-yard touchdown. Springs caught the pass at the five yard line and dragged Redskins cornerback Ray Waddy into the end zone. The Redskins still had a 34-28 lead with 2:20 left in the game.

With time running out and the Redskins facing a third and one, veteran Larry Cole threw Riggins for a two-yard loss and forced the Redskins to punt.

The Cowboys stood 75 yards away from an NFC Eastern Division title. Roger Staubach went back to work like he had done so many times in his career. He drove the Cowboys in only seven plays. During the drive he connected with Tony Hill for 20 yards, then to Preston Pearson for 22 yards. With 1:01 left in the game Staubach went back to Preston Pearson for a 25-yard gain to the Redskins 8 yard line. From there Staubach lofted a pass into the end zone that Tony Hill came down with.

The Cowboys won the game 35-34 over the Redskins and also won their 11th Eastern title in the teams 20-year history. The win also gave the Cowboys a week off and home field advantage in the playoffs. With the win it also knocked the Redskins out of the playoffs

Roger Staubach finished the game with 336 yards passing and three touchdown passes. It was also the 21st time he guided the Cowboys to a fourth quarter win and the 14th time he turned defeat into victory for the Cowboys in the final two minutes of a game.

Tony Hill led all receivers with eight receptions for 113 yards and the game-winning touchdown. Preston Pearson followed Hill with five receptions for 108 yards and one touchdown. Rookie Ron Springs who started in place of the injured Tony Dorsett, rushed for 79 yards and a touchdown. He also added 58 receiving yards with one touchdown.

"What can I say about him?" asked Tom Landry. "Roger is simply super in these kinds of situations. He's done it before and knows he can do it."

Harvey Martin, still in full uniform, threw a wreath that had been sent to the Cowboys facility before the game (later discovered sent by a Dallas fan but from a florist address in Rockville, Maryland) into the Redskins' locker room right after the comeback victory.

Playoffs

Source: Pro-Football-Reference.com

Vegas Spread
Vegas Line= Dal -8.5

Dallas Cowboys 1979 Flashback: Roger and Out!

Two weeks after beating the Redskins the Cowboys were back in Texas Stadium for the divisional round of the playoffs against the Los Angeles Rams. Way back in week 7 of the 1979 season the Rams had come to Texas Stadium and were destroyed by the Cowboys 30-6. Now it was the playoffs and the winner would advance to the NFC Championship game with hopes of making it to Super Bowl XIV.

The Cowboys first three possessions of the game ended in punts. Roger Staubach and the offense couldn't get anything going against the Rams defense to start the game, except for a 27-yard rush by tight end Billy Joe Dupree. The same could be said for the Rams offense who punted on their first two possessions.

The Rams started their third possession from their own 12 yard line and then a five-yard penalty pushed them back to the 7 yard line. On second down Rams quarterback Vince Ferragamo dropped back into the end zone. While trying to avoid the rush from Harvey Martin, Ferragamo stepped up in the pocket and then tried to avoid Randy White. He tried to spin and then slipped and fell in the end zone where White sacked him for a safety. The Cowboys took a 2-0 lead on the Rams.

On the Rams free kick after the safety the Cowboys took over at their 46-yard line. On third down Staubach was rushed, but was never hit. His pass seemed to slip out of his hands and floated high like it was tipped. The Rams came down with an easy interception and returned it to the Cowboys 32 yard line. Once again the Rams could not put a drive together and lined up for a Frank Corral field goal attempt that he missed from 44 yards.

The second quarter started with more punts from both teams. One of Danny White's punts went out of bounds at the Rams 7 yard line. The Cowboys defense figured they had the Rams in trouble again so close to their goal line. But behind the running of Wendell Tyler and Cullen Bryant the Rams quickly were able to drive to the Cowboys 36 yard line where they faced a 4th and 1. The Rams decided to go for it instead and attempting another field goal. They were successful on fourth down and then made the Cowboys pay on the next play. From the 32 yard line Ferragamo threw over Cowboys linebacker DD Lewis who was covering Tyler. Tyler caught the pass at the 15 yard line and outraced the Cowboys defense to the end zone for the score. The Rams took the lead 7-2.

The Cowboys offense had been shut down by the Rams defense for just about the entire first half. They couldn't run the ball and Staubach seemed out of rhythm with his receivers. But like so many times before, Staubach could not be counted out for long. As the first half was coming to a close it was Staubach who connected with Drew Pearson for 17 yards and then with Dupree for 16 yards as the Cowboys drove to the Rams 19 yard line. The drive stalled at the 16 yard line and Rafael Septién connected on a 33-yard field goal to get the Cowboys closer, 7-5.

On two straight kickoffs by Septién he kicked both out of bounds. Back in 1979 this was a five-yard penalty and a re kick. With two penalties it pushed the Cowboys kickoff back to the 25 yard line. The Rams returned Septién's third kickoff to the 31 yard line with time winding down in the first half. Ferragamo quickly completed two straight passes and the Rams found themselves at the Cowboys 43 yard line with 17 seconds left. Then with only 11 seconds left Ferragamo was able to get a pass off as Randy White hit him hard and took him down. The pass made its way into the end zone where Rams wide receiver Ron Smith came down with the ball while covered by two Cowboys defenders. The Rams went into halftime leading the Cowboys 14-5.

The Rams defense in the first half was able to control the Cowboys running game and was able to limit any big plays from Staubach. The Cowboys defense played well, but the Rams offense was able to make a few more plays then the Cowboys and that led to their nine-point lead going into the third quarter. But this was the Cowboys who were America's team. They had Roger Staubach and the Doomsday defense and were known for exciting games and great comebacks. As the second half got started it seemed as though everyone was waiting for that moment that the Cowboys would come alive and make their move.

It didn't take the Cowboys defense very long to make a play as the third quarter got under way. Dennis Thurman intercepted Ferragamo at the Cowboys 46 yard line and returned it to the Rams 34 yard line. But once again the Cowboys offense could not put a drive together and could not take advantage of the turnover and had to punt.

The Cowboys defense was able to force the Rams to punt and the Cowboys offense took over with great field position at their 46-yard line. Staubach connected with Drew Pearson for 29 yards and got to the Rams 25 yard line. On the next play Tom Landry went to his bag of tricks and ran a halfback option with Ron Springs. Springs threw into the end zone and found Tony Hill for a touchdown, but one official over ruled the one who signaled touchdown, saying that Hill didn't have both feet in bounds before stepping out the back of the end zone. Then Staubach threw into the end zone for Tony Dorsett and was intercepted, but the Rams were called for pass interference and that put the Cowboys at the one yard line. From there Ron Springs scored on the next play and the Cowboys closed to within 14-12.

On the Rams next possession they drove to the Cowboys 43 yard line. Then the Cowboys defense came up with another turnover as Cliff Harris intercepted Ferragamo. The Cowboys offense took over at the 43 yard line as the third quarter came to an end.

The Cowboys offense in the third quarter was playing much better than they were in the first half. They were able to gain yards in the running game and Staubach was now able to find open receivers, but it just didn't seem like the Cowboys that everyone was used to seeing. As the fourth quarter started the Cowboys offense quickly drove inside the Rams 10 yard line off the Harris interception. Then, from the 2 yard line, Staubach found tight end Jay Saldi wide open for the go ahead score with 12:46 left in the game. Staubach was hit hard on the play and was shaken up, but was able to walk to the sideline. From that point on Danny White was seen warming up just in case he was needed. The Cowboys now led the Rams 19-14.

The Rams once again were able to drive the ball on the Cowboys defense. They reached the Cowboys 32 yard line where they faced a 4th and 8. Instead of attempting a field goal they decided to go for the first down. Ferragamo threw to wide receiver Drew Hill and the pass fell incomplete. A flag was thrown for pass interference, but after a discussion between the officials it was ruled that there was no interference and the flag was picked up.

The Cowboys offense took over at the 32 yard line with 6:59 left. On the first play Dorsett hit a hole and raced up the middle for a 26-yard gain to the Rams 42 yard line. From there the Cowboys could not go any further and had to punt.

The Rams got the ball with 4:22 left and Ferragamo connected with wide receiver Billy Waddy for a 36-yard gain to the Cowboys 44 yard line. A holding penalty on the Rams pushed them back to the 46 yard line and they ended up punting back to the Cowboys.

With only 2:45 left and the Cowboys sitting at their 21-yard line all they needed to do was get a first down to seal the game, but they were not able to move the ball like they had done during the third quarter and the beginning of the fourth quarter. On first down, Robert Newhouse lost a yard. On second down, a screen pass to Tony Hill only gained a yard. On third down Staubach was rushed and he rolled out to his right and was tackled for no gain. In the process of stopping the Cowboys from getting a first down the Rams also used their last two timeouts and the Cowboys were forced to punt for the eighth time in the game.

The Rams got the ball back at midfield with 2:16 left and no timeouts. On the first play Ferragamo fired a pass over the middle to Billy Waddy who caught it on the run at the Cowboys 28 yard line. Waddy then out raced the Cowboys defense and scored easily to take the lead 21-19.

After the kickoff the Cowboys took over at the 21 yard line. The Cowboys and their fans had seen this type of situation countless times in Cowboys history. There was only 1:57 remaining, the Cowboys had two timeouts, any kind of score wins the game and the great Roger Staubach was under center to work his magic that he had done so many times before in his career. The script couldn't have been written any better for the Cowboys. But there was something was different about this game. The moment where the Cowboys took control of the game never seemed to come even after they took a 19-14 lead. If that moment was ever going to come it had to be this moment with 1:57 left in the game.

On first down, Dorsett gained 12 yard to the 33 yard line. On the next play, Staubach over threw Tony Hill. Then, on second down, Staubach once again over threw Hill. Everyone seemed to be waiting for that one play that got the Cowboys rolling towards victory. What happened on third down has become Dallas Cowboys trivia for years. Staubach dropped back and threw a pass directly at offensive lineman Herbert Scott, who caught the ball. A flag was thrown for ineligible receiver and the Cowboys now faced a 4th and 20. It was the last chance for that Staubach magic to come through so that the Cowboys could advance to the NFC Championship game. Staubach dropped back and threw for Drew Pearson. The pass sailed high on Pearson and fell incomplete.

The Rams offense took over with 1:07 left. They played it safe and on fourth down they lined up for a field goal attempt with 13 seconds remaining. The Rams faked the field goal as holder Nolan Cromwell kept the ball and ran for the first down. The Rams won the game 21-19 and shattered the Cowboys hopes of a 6th Super Bowl in the 1970s.

The loss to the Rams in 1979 was one of the worst playoff defeats in Cowboys history. Some say the loss had to do with the dramatic game against the Redskins that put the Cowboys in the playoffs. Others believe that the Cowboys just overlooked the Rams. Whatever the reasons were, the Cowboys season ended that Sunday in Texas Stadium. The Staubach magic also ended that day and on March 31, 1980, he announced his retirement from the Cowboys and the NFL after 11 seasons and two Super Bowl Championships.

Standings

Roster

Statistics

Passing

Rushing

Receiving

References

Dallas Cowboys seasons
NFC East championship seasons
Dallas Cowboys
Dallas Cowboys